Serbian question refers to several periods in Serbian history and diplomatic history.

Establishment of a Serb nation-state, leading up to the Serbian Revolution.
Official recognition of Revolutionary Serbia as the Principality of Serbia and international recognition (1815–1878).
Great Eastern Crisis (1875–78).
Pan-Slavism and Yugoslavism versus Pan-Serbism, in the Kingdom of Serbia and Serb community in Austria-Hungary.
Serb unification in the Balkan Wars and World War I, and Austrian thwarting of Serbian expansion and influence.
Creation of the Serbian Banovina in the Kingdom of Yugoslavia in 1940.
Status of Serbia (and Serbs) within SFR Yugoslavia.
Serb unification in the Yugoslav Wars.

See also
Creation of Yugoslavia
Serbian historiography

References

Sources

 
 
 
 
 
 
 
 
 
 
 
 
 
 
 
 
 
 
 
 
 
 
 
 

Modern history of Serbia
History of foreign relations of Serbia
Austria-Hungary–Serbia relations
History of the Serbs
National questions